A monetary system is a system by which a government provides money in a country's economy. Modern monetary systems usually consist of the national treasury, the mint, the central banks and commercial banks.

Commodity money system

A commodity money system is a monetary system in which a commodity such as gold or seashells is made the unit of value and physically used as money. The money retains its value because of its physical properties. In some cases, a government may stamp a metal coin with a face, value or mark that indicates its weight or asserts its purity, but the value remains the same even if the coin is melted down.

Commodity-backed money

One step away from commodity money is "commodity-backed money", also known as "representative money".  Many currencies have consisted of bank-issued notes which have no inherent physical value, but which may be exchanged for a precious metal, such as gold.  (This is known as the gold standard.)  The silver standard was widespread after the fall of the Byzantine Empire, and lasted until 1935, when it was abandoned by China and Hong Kong.

A 20th-century variation was bimetallism, also called the "double standard", under which both gold and silver were legal tender.

Fiat money

The alternative to a commodity money system is fiat money which is defined by a central bank and government law as legal tender even if it has no intrinsic value. Originally fiat money was paper currency or base metal coinage, but in modern economies it mainly exists as data such as bank balances and records of credit or debit card purchases, and the fraction that exists as notes and coins is relatively small. Money is mostly created by banks when they loan to customers. Put simply, banks lending currency to customers, subject to each bank's  regulatory limit, is the principal mode of new deposit creation.

The central bank does not directly fix the amount of currency in circulation, nor is central bank money. Although commercial banks create circulating money via lending, they cannot do so freely without limit. Banks are limited in how much they can lend both by regulatarory limits and by good management practice, in order to remain profitable and solvent. Prudential regulation also acts as a constraint on banks’ activities in order to maintain the resilience of the financial system. And the households and companies who receive the money created by new lending may take actions that affect the stock of money – they could quickly ‘destroy’ the money or currency by using it to repay their existing debt, for instance.

Central banks control the creation of money by commercial banks, by setting interest rates on reserves. This limits the amount of money the commercial banks are willing to lend, and thus create, as it affects the profitability of lending in a competitive market. This is the opposite of what many people believe about the creation of fiat money. The most common misconception was that central banks print all the money, this is not reflective of what actually happens.

Today's global monetary system is essentially a fiat system because people can use paper bills or bank balances to buy goods.

See also

 Causes of the Great Depression
 Credit theory of money
 Criticism of the Federal Reserve
 Great Contraction
 Imperial minting ordinance
 Imperial minting standard
 International monetary systems
 Monetarism
 Monetary economics
 Monetary policy
 Money creation
 Money supply
 Price system

References

External links
 Historical documents, including discussions and debates regarding the use of various monetary standards

Banking
Monetary economics
Monetary reform
Business terms